Chicken chasseur (and ) is a chicken dish that is a part of French cuisine. The primary ingredients in hunter's chicken are sautéed chicken and a reduced chasseur sauce prepared using tomatoes, mushrooms, onions, white wine, brandy and tarragon.

Several other dishes from around the world share these names; yet each version is very different, with few to no similarities besides the use of chicken.

Etymology
 means "hunter" in French, which also refers to the chasseur sauce. Hunter's chicken shares the same literal name as chicken cacciatore in Italy ( means "hunter" in Italian).

Overview
French hunter's chicken is prepared using sautéed chicken that is cooked crisp and a chasseur sauce consisting of tomatoes, mushrooms, onions, white wine, brandy and tarragon. Prior to sautéeing, the chicken can be dredged in flour. Tomato ingredients can include diced tomatoes, canned crushed tomatoes and canned tomato paste. Additional ingredients in hunter's chicken can include shallots, olive oil, chicken stock and vermouth, and in addition to tarragon, additional spices and seasonings can include marjoram, thyme, bay leaf, salt and pepper. The sauce for hunter's chicken is typically prepared and thickened by the process of reduction. The dish can be garnished with ingredients such as parsley and croutons. Hunter's chicken can become more flavorful after sitting and then being reheated, which allows the flavors of the ingredients to further intermingle.

See also

 List of chicken dishes
 List of French dishes

References

French chicken dishes
Foods with alcoholic drinks